CCGS Alexander Henry is a former Canadian Coast Guard light icebreaker and buoy tender that served on the Great Lakes from 1959 to 1984. In 1986, the vessel was handed over to  the Marine Museum of the Great Lakes in Kingston, Ontario for preservation as a museum ship. Previously, during the summer months the vessel was also operated as a bed and breakfast. In 2017, the ship was sold to the Lakehead Transportation Museum Society in Thunder Bay, Ontario and in June, was relocated to the Pool 6 site on the town's harbour front, where Alexander Henry continues as a museum ship.

Design and description
Alexander Henry is a light icebreaker and buoy tender that was designed to serve on the Great Lakes. The ship is powered by two Fairbanks-Morse 10-cylinder 2-cycle 37F16 diesel engines driving two shafts creating . No helicopter facilities were added to the ship as they were considered unnecessary for freshwater operations.

Operational history
The vessel was constructed by Port Arthur Shipbuilding Co. Ltd. at their yard in Port Arthur, Ontario and launched on 18 July 1958. The icebreaker entered service in July 1959 with the Department of Transport's Marine Service as CGS Alexander Henry using the prefix "Canadian Government Ship". Named after Alexander Henry the elder, an 18th-century British explorer and fur trader, she was transferred in 1962 to the newly created Canadian Coast Guard and given the new prefix Canadian Coast Guard Ship (CCGS).

CCGS Alexander Henry served her entire coast guard career on the Great Lakes, stationed on Lake Superior. In 1976, the vessel was used for an experiment testing the icebreaking capability of a hover platform pushed in front of the ship. Attached to the ship's bow, the hover platform worked well in certain conditions, but required too much fuel and made excess noise. The hover platform also became an impediment to the ship should the platform breakdown. The planned deployment to cargo ships was never approved and though the experiment failed, self-propelled hovercraft are now utilised for icebreaking. Alexander Henry retired from service in 1985 after  entered service.

Museum ship
In June 1985, Alexander Henry was turned over the Marine Museum of the Great Lakes in Kingston, Ontario to become a museum ship. The vessel was used as floating maritime gallery and seasonal bed and breakfast by the museum.

Alexander Henry entered Kingston's drydocks in 2010 to undergo inspection for conservation issues. Following the sale of the property in early 2016 that the Marine Museum was housed in, the museum was forced to find a new location for Alexander Henry. The ship was temporarily housed by a local entrepreneur until the former Coast Guard vessel's fate can be determined. The icebreaker was moved to a wharf near Prinyer's Cove in Prince Edward County, Ontario. The city of Kingston was given three options to deal with the ship; offer to sell Alexander Henry to Thunder Bay, where the vessel was constructed. This was the cheapest alternative in disposing of the ship, as converting it to an artificial reef would cost over $422,000 and to scrap the vessel, $326,000.

The Lakehead Transportation Museum Society purchased the vessel for $2 and on 11 April 2017, received $125,000 provided by the City of Thunder Bay to cover towing costs to bring the ship from Kingston to Thunder Bay. Alexander Henry departed Kingston on 20 June and arrived in Thunder Bay on 28 June. The vessel was docked temporarily at the C.N. Ore Dock until Alexander Henrys permanent site was ready at the Pool 6 site along the city's waterfront. The museum ship opened to public tours on 18 July.

References

Citations

Sources

External links

 Official webpage of the Lakehead Transportation Museum Society

Icebreakers of the Canadian Coast Guard
Museum ships in Canada
Museum ships in Ontario
1958 ships
Ships built in Ontario
Canadian Government Ship